The Ashtabula River is a river located northeast of Cleveland in Ohio. The river flows into Lake Erie at the city of Ashtabula, Ohio.

Name
Ashtabula derives from Lenape language ashte-pihële, 'always enough (fish) to go around, to be given away', a contraction from apchi 'always' + tepi 'enough' + hële (verb of motion).

According to the Geographic Names Information System, the Ashtabula River has also been known as:
 Ashtibula River
 Riviere Auscubalu
 Riviere Oscubolu

Watershed
On October 30, 2008 the river was designated a State Scenic River by the Director of the Ohio Department of Natural Resources.

Pollution
In 1985 the first two miles of the river was named an "Area of Concern" by the International Joint Commission, primarily because of Fields Brook, a tributary that had received discharges from 19 industries between the 1940s and 1970s. The cleanup was deemed complete in 2014 and the river was delisted in 2021.

Tributaries
 Fields Brook
 Strong Brook
 Hubbard Run
 Ashtabula Creek
 West Branch Ashtabula River
 East Branch Ashtabula River

See also
 List of rivers of Ohio
 Ashtabula River railroad disaster (1876)
 Smolen–Gulf Bridge, a covered bridge across the river (2008–present)
 USS Ashtabula (AO-51)

References 

Rivers of Ohio
Rivers of Ashtabula County, Ohio
Tributaries of Lake Erie